Put a Spell on You is Casey Abrams' first release on Chesky Records and features the former American Idol contestant returning to his jazz roots. Abrams recorded the album over two days at the Hirsch Center in Brooklyn, New York, a decommissioned church featuring acoustics termed "ethereal" by Abrams. The album released on March 16, 2018, and debuted at #5 on the Billboard Jazz Charts.

Track listing 

 "Robot Lovers" – 3:31
 "Meet the Flintstones" – 2:55
 "Cougartown" – 4:22
 "I Put a Spell on You" – 2:41
 "Lost and Looking" – 5:28
 "Let's Make Out" – 4:17
 "Nature Boy" – 3:56
 "Never Know" – 3:58
 "Georgia on My Mind" – 4:42
 "High Drunk Love You" – 3:56
 "Have You Ever Seen the Rain" – 3:22
 "Moon Song" – 2:52
 "Take the A Train" – 3:33

Personnel 

 Casey Abrams - Bass, Vocals, 12 String Guitar
 Taylor Tesler - Guitar, Vocals
 Jacob Scesney - Saxophone, Percussion
 David Chesky - Producer
 Norman Chesky - Producer
 Nicholas Prout - Recording, Editing, Mastering
 Janelle Costa - Second Engineer
 Rich Cerbini - Assistant Engineer
 Paul Machado - General Assistant

References 

2018 albums
Jazz albums by American artists